TSEB Mahottari is a school located in Mahottari Bazzar, Mahottari district, Nepal.

Secondary schools in Nepal
2008 establishments in Nepal
Mahottari District